WMSL (88.9 FM) is a Christian radio station broadcasting a Contemporary Christian music format. Licensed to Bogart, Georgia, United States, the station serves the Athens / Northeast Georgia area.  The station is currently owned by the Radio Training Network, Inc.

History 
The station was assigned the call letters WPBS on 1987-04-01. On 1987-09-15, the station changed its call sign to the current WMSL.

See also 
 WVFJ-FM — 93.3 FM, licensed to Greenville, Georgia

References

External links

MSL
Contemporary Christian radio stations in the United States
Radio stations established in 1987
MSL